Wilhelm Anton "Bill" Leeb (born 21 September 1966, in Vienna, Austria) is an Austrian-Canadian electronic musician and record producer. He is best known for being a founding member of the industrial music group Front Line Assembly. Additionally, Leeb is known for his work with groups such as Noise Unit, Delerium, Intermix, and Skinny Puppy, among others.

Career
Leeb began his musical career with industrial band Skinny Puppy in 1985 under the pseudonym Wilhelm Schroeder, contributing bass synth and occasional backing vocals to a few of their recordings and concerts. He left in 1986 and formed his own industrial project Front Line Assembly with Michael Balch, and later Rhys Fulber and Chris Peterson. Though Front Line Assembly has had consistent underground success, Leeb's most widely known efforts are through his side project Delerium, which had a major hit in the late 1990s with "Silence". Leeb composed the soundtrack to the 1999 video game, Quake III Arena, of which the expansion pack, Team Arena, was composed by his band, Front Line Assembly.

In 2017, Leeb appeared as guest singer on the single A Shiver of Want, a release of John Fryer's project Black Needle Noise.

Musical projects in which Bill Leeb has participated in include:
Front Line Assembly
Delerium
Synæsthesia
Cyberaktif (with cEvin Key and Dwayne Goettel)
Noise Unit
Intermix
Equinox
Skinny Puppy
Fauxliage
Pro>Tech

Dispute with Trent Reznor
In an interview with music magazine Spin in 1992, Trent Reznor of Nine Inch Nails made derogatory remarks about Front Line Assembly, calling them "a textbook case of a band" for industrial music and their music "monotonous, boring, uninspired bullshit". Before the release of the issue, Reznor sent Leeb an apology letter. Spin printed the letter, along with a letter from Leeb dismissing the notion that Reznor was "leading the industrial revolution in music" in one of their following issues.

Acting
In 1990, Leeb appeared in the trailer for the horror movie Chunk Blower together with Dwayne Goettel from Skinny Puppy, playing one of the victims of a killer. Due to the lack of funding, the movie was never made. Director Jim Van Bebber and Leeb would later use footage from the trailer in the video for the single "Virus".

Personal life
He has both Austrian and Canadian citizenship and speaks English as well as German. He moved to Kitimat, British Columbia, Canada with his family when he was 14. He was a high school student at Mount Elizabeth Secondary School.  Leeb went to Camsoun College in Victoria, British Columbia to study journalism for two years. He lives in Vancouver.

Leeb was married to the Canadian artist Carylann Loeppky. Loeppky was part of the tour personnel on Front Line Assembly tours "designing and selling merchandise and put together a visual presentation for the live performance." She continued to create artwork for albums of Delerium.

References

Further reading
 

1966 births
Living people
Canadian electronic musicians
Electronic body music musicians
New-age musicians
Austrian emigrants to Canada
Musicians from Vienna
Skinny Puppy members
Musicians from Vancouver
Canadian people of Austrian descent
Canadian industrial musicians
People from Kitimat
Front Line Assembly members
Delerium members
Noise Unit members
20th-century Canadian keyboardists